Slättens IK is a Swedish football club located in Lysekil.

External links
 Slättens IK – Official website 

Football clubs in Västra Götaland County